The Neon God: Part 2 – The Demise is the twelfth studio album by the American heavy metal band  W.A.S.P. It is the second act of a two-part rock opera about an abused and orphaned boy named Jesse, who finds that he has the ability to read and manipulate people. The first album is titled The Neon God: Part 1 - The Rise.

Track listing

Personnel
W.A.S.P.
Blackie Lawless – vocals, guitars, bass, keyboards, percussion, producer
Darrell Roberts – lead guitar, vocals, percussion, executive producer
Mike Duda – bass
Stet Howland – drums, percussion

Production
Marc Moreau – mixing
Bob Stone – mastering
Kosh – album art

References

External links
http://www.waspnation.com/neonstory.htm

W.A.S.P. albums
Albums produced by Blackie Lawless
Rock operas
Sanctuary Records albums
2004 albums
Noise Records albums
Sequel albums